Gumnaam (translation: Unknown or Anonymous) is a 1965 Indian Bollywood thriller film directed by Raja Nawathe, starring Manoj Kumar, Nanda, Pran, Helen and Mehmood. The film is a loosely-inspired adaptation of the 1939 mystery novel And Then There Were None by Agatha Christie.

The film came to wider attention in the English-speaking world when its opening song "Jaan Pehechan Ho" (a Hindi-Urdu phrase roughly translated as "we should get to know each other") was included in the opening credits of Ghost World and used in the 2011 commercial The Date for Heineken. The song was sung by Bollywood music legend Mohammed Rafi. The lead dancer in the song as shot in the film was Laxmi Chhaya. The psychedelic choreography was done by Herman Benjamin, who also sang the song as picturised in the film. It was remade in Tamil as Naalai Unathu Naal

Plot

Khanna, a wealthy man, hires an assassin to murder his rival, Sohanlal. Khanna then informs the victim's niece, Asha, of his death, on the phone. As Asha screams, an intruder enters and shoots Khanna dead.

A few days later, Asha wins a trip to a foreign country with six others: Barrister Rakesh, Dharamdas, Kishan, Dr Acharya, Madhusudan Sharma, and Kitty Kelly. The aircraft carrying the six winners and crew member Anand is forced to make an emergency landing at an unknown island. However, as soon as Anand and all the passengers alight from the plane, it takes off, leaving everyone stranded.

A mysterious, unseen woman starts singing a song. The song is heard at different points in time during the film without the woman being seen. Then the group notices a mansion and enters it. The mansion seems to be unoccupied except for a butler. Dharamdas finds a diary that reveals that they are all connected to a crime, and that they will all be killed.

Anand discovers Dr Acharya has brought with him a bottle of poison, and Dharamdas has brought a dagger. The butler's actions indicate the presence of an unknown person in the house.

Anand starts flirting with Asha while Rakesh and Kitty become close. Everyone is suspicious of everyone else.

Anand and Asha find Kishan's corpse. The killer has left a note stating that Kishan had murdered Sohanlal. The group deduces Dharamdas killed Kishan but he pleads innocence. Dharamdas is later found dead. Anand concludes the culprit is among them.

It becomes clear that everyone in the house was connected to Sohanlal. Kitty was Sohanlal's secretary. Rakesh wrote Sohanlal's will on Khanna's orders. Kitty sent the will to Rakesh on Khanna's instructions, though neither knew about the other.

Anand notices Rakesh hiding an axe. Later, Dr. Acharya arrives, screaming that Sharma has been killed with an axe. The killer leaves another note stating Sharma was Khanna's co-conspirator in Sohanlal's murder.

Anand accuses Rakesh of Sharma's murder. Dr. Acharya catches the butler acting suspiciously. He learns the butler's secret and a scuffle ensues between them. The doctor enters the dining room, utters Anand's name, and collapses in the presence of Asha and Kitty. They realise that he has been stabbed. Asha starts questioning her faith in Anand.

Kitty goes for a walk by herself and is strangled. Rakesh and Asha, searching for Kitty, find her corpse. Anand's hat is lying near the corpse. Rakesh sees Anand and starts chasing him, but loses his trail. In a fit of rage, Rakesh tries to rape Asha. She escapes but runs into Rakesh again as he collapses with two daggers in his back. The mansion's lights go out, which indicates the killer has arrived and that Asha is next.

The killer approaches her and she faints. He carries her into a secret room and revives her. Sharma, the killer, tells Asha he convinced Dr. Acharya to help him fake his own death. He then murdered the doctor. Anand appears and reveals he is a police inspector. Sharma is an escaped convict whose real name is Madanlal.

Madanlal reveals that he, Khanna, and  Sohanlal were partners in smuggling. However, after Madanlal was caught by the police, the other two betrayed him. Khanna then had Sohanlal killed to usurp his share of the money as well. After Madanlal was released, he killed Khanna and ensured his targets "won" the lucky draw and took the trip.

Madanlal ties up Anand and Asha and plays Russian Roulette with them. However, the butler secretly frees Anand. As Madanlal is about to shoot Asha with the only bullet, Anand attacks Madanlal. In the ensuing melee, Madanlal escapes the mansion and runs toward the shore. A plane full of policemen arrives and Madanlal is arrested. The "ghost" woman who sings the ominous song turns out to be the butler's mentally ill sister. Anand, Asha, the butler and his sister leave on the plane.

Cast
 Nanda as Asha
 Manoj Kumar as Anand / Inspector Anand
 Pran as Barrister Rakesh
 Helen as Kitty Kelly
 Mehmood as the butler
 Dhumal as Dharamdas
 Madan Puri as Dr. Acharya
 Tarun Bose as Madhusudan Sharma/ Madanlal
 Manmohan as Kishan
 Laxmi Chhaya as the masked dancer
 Naina as the Butlers Sister
 Herman Benjamin as the Masked Singer
 Ted Lyons & His Cubs as the Club Band

Soundtrack

Critic Shahid Khan rated the soundtrack 9 out of 10 stating, "Gumnaam is sometimes unfairly overlooked but I believe that it is one of Shankar–Jaikishan's best albums."

According to film expert Rajesh Subramanian, a cold war prevailed between Mehmood and Manoj Kumar during the making of the film. Kumar tried to convince the director to discard the song "Hum kaale hain toh kya hua", which was picturised on Mehmood, from the film. However, it was kept and went on to become a hit and one of the highlights of the film. An English-language version of the song titled "The She I Love", sung by Mohammed Rafi, was also recorded.

Trivia

The plane used in the movie was a 1943 Douglas C-47A-85-DL built for the United States Airforce.  It was serial #43-15546,
Construction #20012. It saw a long multi-national career until it was purchased by Kasturi and Sons,India (VT-DTS) to deliver The Indu newspaper in distant areas. It was decommissioned and transferred to Nadargul  airstrip where it is used  by the Flytech Aviation Academy for ground training (2018)

Reception

Box office
Gumnaam became a box office hit. It was the 8th highest-grossing film in India in 1965, grossing 2.6 crore. This was equivalent to $5.46 million in 1965, and is equivalent to US$ million or 275 crore in 2016.

Awards and nominations
 Filmfare Nomination for Best Supporting Actress – Helen
 Filmfare Nomination for Best Supporting Actor – Mehmood
 Filmfare Best Art Direction Award – Colour Movie – S.S. Samel

Notes

References

External links
 
 Where is the plane (VT-DTS) used in the movie Gumnaam  today?   https://aviation.stackexchange.com/questions/48535/what-is-that-decommissioned-plane-near-nadirgul-airfield
Feel the love! Ted Lyons & His Cubs  https://memsaabstory.com/2010/01/25/feel-the-love-ted-lyons-his-cubs/

1960s Hindi-language films
1965 films
Films based on And Then There Were None
Films scored by Shankar–Jaikishan
Indian aviation films
Indian ghost films
Films directed by Raja Nawathe
Films set in country houses